Criorhina konakovi is a species of hoverfly in the family Syrphidae.

Distribution
Russia.

References

Eristalinae
Diptera of Asia
Insects described in 1955
Taxa named by Aleksandr Stackelberg